The Severn River is a tidal estuary  long, located in Anne Arundel County in the U.S. state of Maryland, south of the Magothy River and north of the South River.

Geography
Thus, its total watershed area is 15% water. Its source is the beginning of the non-tidal nine-mile long Severn Run in northwestern Anne Arundel County in Severn, Maryland. The river enters the Chesapeake Bay near the major port city of Annapolis, also the capital of Maryland. Most famous for the United States Naval Academy campus situated at the mouth of the river, the Severn provides an access point to the Chesapeake Bay not just for midshipmen but also for fishermen and pleasure boaters. Several tributary creeks drain highly developed areas, including Weems Creek and its nontidal portion Cowhide Branch, which drain most of the Annapolis Mall and the Anne Arundel Medical Center.

The Severn River is crossed by two bridges. One, known as the Severn River Bridge or Pearl Harbor Memorial Bridge, carries US 50/US 301/MD 2 and was first built in 1886. The other carries MD 450, and is now officially named the "US Naval Academy Bridge" because its south end traverses the academy.  The latter bridge was built as a drawbridge in the late 1920s and replaced with the current high span in 1994.  A former railroad trestle between the two current bridges, built in about 1887 for the Annapolis and Baltimore Short Line Railroad (which became part of the Washington, Baltimore and Annapolis Electric Railway), was removed post-1968 when it was declared unsafe.

On the northshore from Annapolis is the communities of St. Margaret's adjacent to the colonial plantation of Whitehall.

Tributaries
If a tributary has sub-tributaries (commonly the upper, nontidal portion) below, they are listed after the "&".
North Shore (Upriver to downriver)
Pointfield Branch
Bear Branch
Cold Spring Branch (Cool Spring Branch)
Chartwell Branch
Stevens Creek & Lake Liberty
Rock Cove
Forked Creek & Sacketts Pond
Yantz Creek (Yantz Cove) & Cedar Creek
Sullivan Cove
Ringgold Cove
Asquith Creek (Aisquith Creek)
Rays Pond
Chase Creek (Timberneck Creek)
Cool Spring Cove (or Creek)
Winchester Pond (Crouchs Pond)
Manresa Pond (Browns Cove or Pond)
Woolchurch Cove & Pond
Carr Creek

South Shore (Upriver to downriver)
Sewell Spring Branch 
Indian Creek & Indian Creek Branch
Cypress Branch
Arden Pond
Plum Creek & Gumbottom Branch
Valentine Creek 
Old Place Creek (Fox Creek)
Browns Cove (on Little Round Bay)
Maynadier Creek & Deep Ditch Branch 
Hopkins Creek & Davids Run
Brewer Pond & Arthurs Run
Brewer Creek & Howards Branch
Clements Creek & Hockley Branch
Saltworks Creek & Cabin Branch
Martins Pond (Whitehurst Lake)
Luce Creek & Howard Creek
Cove of Cork
Weems Creek & Cowhide Branch
Shady Lake
College Creek (Dorsey Creek) & Peters Cove
Spa Creek (Spaw Creek, Carrols Creek) & Acton Cove, Hawkins Cove 
Back Creek
Lake Ogleton

Providence
Providence, the first colonial settlement in Anne Arundel County, was founded in the fall and winter of 1649–1650 at the beginning of a mass migration of a group of Puritans and non-conformists from Lower Norfolk County in Virginia to primarily the north side of the mouth of the Severn.  It faded away after the 1680s when Annapolis came into favor and, in 1694, became Maryland's capital.  This "lost town" of Providence was originally thought to be limited to the Carr Creek and Greenbury Point area across the river from Annapolis on what are now the grounds of Naval Station Annapolis (renamed North Severn Complex.)  More recent archaeological research has uncovered homes of this scattered settlement further to the north and northeast as well, on the southern half of the Broadneck Peninsula, especially near Whitehall Creek.

References

NOAA Chart of Severn River
Severn River history from Anne Arundel County web site
A. T. Davison and C. B. Rucker. Gems of the Severn (Severn River Commission, Annapolis, MD, 1988) Available from Scenic Rivers Land Trust, http://www.srlt.org

Further reading
Maryland DNR's Surf Your Watershed: Severn River
Severn River Association
Severn Riverkeeper
Severn River Commission
College Creek watershed assessment from 2007

Severn River area publications and forums
Annapolis Forum: Electronic Discussion for Annapolis MD Area Folk
The Capital Newspaper Environment section for Severn River and Chesapeake Bay

 

Tributaries of the Chesapeake Bay
Rivers of Maryland
Annapolis, Maryland
Rivers of Anne Arundel County, Maryland